The 1st constituency of Nord is a French legislative constituency in the Nord département.

Description

The 1st constituency of Nord covers the centre and south of the city Lille.

In the early years of the Fifth Republic the seat was held by Gaullist parties for the first two decades of the 21st century. It was a comfortable seat for the Socialist Party.  La France Insoumise took the seat in the
2017 election.

Historic Representation

Election results

2022

 
 
 
 
 
 
 
 
|-
| colspan="8" bgcolor="#E9E9E9"|
|-

2017

2012

 
 
 
 
 
 
|-
| colspan="8" bgcolor="#E9E9E9"|
|-

2007

 
 
 
 
 
 
|-
| colspan="8" bgcolor="#E9E9E9"|
|-

2002

 
 
 
 
 
 
|-
| colspan="8" bgcolor="#E9E9E9"|
|-

1997

 
 
 
 
 
 
 
|-
| colspan="8" bgcolor="#E9E9E9"|
|-

Sources
Official results of French elections from 2002: "Résultats électoraux officiels en France" (in French).

1